George Charles Baumann IV (born December 9, 1987) is an American professional baseball pitcher for the Wei Chuan Dragons of the Chinese Professional Baseball League. He has played in Major League Baseball (MLB) for the San Diego Padres and the New York Mets.

Career

Amateur
Prior to playing professionally, he attended Logan-Rogersville High School and then Missouri State University. In 2008, he played collegiate summer baseball with the Brewster Whitecaps of the Cape Cod Baseball League, and was named a league all-star. In 2009, Baumann was named the Missouri Valley Conference Pitcher of the Year, a finalist for the National Pitcher of the Year Award and a semifinalist for the Golden Spikes Award.

Kansas City Royals
He was selected by the Kansas City Royals in the 7th round of the 2009 MLB draft and was signed by scout Scott Melvin.

He allowed three runs (one earned) in five innings for the Burlington Royals that summer, throwing three wild pitches. In 2010, he was 4–2 with four saves and a 2.24 ERA in 31 games (14 starts) for the Wilmington Blue Rocks. He struck out 113 batters in 100 1/3 innings. In 2011, he was  4–3, with 2 saves and a 4.29 ERA in 25 games for the Northwest Arkansas Naturals and 0–1 with 3 runs in 4.2 IP for the AZL Royals.

The left-handed pitcher  went 3–2 with two saves and a 4.12 ERA for Northwest Arkansas in 2012, walking 33 in 59 IP. In 2013, he was 3–0 with a save and a 2.55 ERA in 32 games split between the Naturals and Storm Chasers. He struck out 72 batters in 53 innings.

San Diego Padres
On December 21, 2015, he signed a one-year major league contract with the San Diego Padres.

On July 15, 2016, he was called up to the MLB. He made his MLB debut on July 16, throwing one pitch to Brandon Crawford of the San Francisco Giants and recording an out. He was demoted on the following day. He became only the twelfth player to throw only one pitch in his MLB debut.

Baumann was a solid reliever ending the 2016 season with a 3.74 ERA in 9.2 innings pitched, allowing a .200 batting average against batters.

On April 13, 2018, Baumann was suspended for one game for his involvement in a brawl with the Colorado Rockies two days prior. He was designated for assignment on April 24.

New York Mets
The New York Mets claimed Baumann off waivers on April 27, 2018. The Mets added Baumann to their active roster on May 11 after placing Hansel Robles on the disabled list.
On June 5, Baumann was designated for assignment. He elected free agency on November 2, 2018.

Lancaster Barnstormers
On April 5, 2019, Baumann signed with the Lancaster Barnstormers of the Atlantic League of Professional Baseball. 
He announced his retirement from professional baseball on August 6, 2019.

Baltimore Orioles
On March 2, 2022, Baumann came out of retirement to sign a minor league contract with the Baltimore Orioles. Baumann was released by the Orioles on April 6, before he made an appearance for the organization.

Lincoln Saltdogs
On April 18, 2022, Baumann signed with the Lincoln Saltdogs of the American Association of Professional Baseball. In 2022, Baumann recorded a 1–1 record and 2.03 ERA in 5 appearances with the Saltdogs.

Acereros de Monclova
On June 12, 2022, Baumann signed with the Acereros de Monclova of the Mexican League.

Wei Chuan Dragons
On September 19, 2022, Baumann signed with the Wei Chuan Dragons of the Chinese Professional Baseball League.

Coaching career
In 2020, Baumann served as the pitching coach for the Arizona Complex League Angels of the Los Angeles Angels organization. Baumann reprised the role for the 2021 season.

Pitching style
Baumann has five pitches: a four-seam fastball that tops off at 92 mph, cutter which hovers around 81 mph, a two-seam fastball around 81 mph, a changeup hovering at 82 mph, and a slider that is around 86 mph.

References

External links

1987 births
Living people
Acereros de Monclova players
Arizona League Royals players
Baseball players at the 2015 Pan American Games
Baseball players from Illinois
Brewster Whitecaps players
Burlington Royals players
El Paso Chihuahuas players
Lancaster Barnstormers players
Las Vegas 51s players
Major League Baseball pitchers
Missouri State Bears baseball players
New York Mets players
Northwest Arkansas Naturals players
Omaha Storm Chasers players
Pan American Games medalists in baseball
Pan American Games silver medalists for the United States
San Diego Padres players
Tiburones de La Guaira players
American expatriate baseball players in Venezuela
Toros del Este players
American expatriate baseball players in the Dominican Republic
American expatriate baseball players in Mexico
United States national baseball team players
Wilmington Blue Rocks players
Medalists at the 2015 Pan American Games
St. Cloud River Bats players